Galeodopsis is a genus of Galeodid camel spiders, first described by Aleksei Birula in 1903.

Species 
, the World Solifugae Catalog accepts the following five species:

 Galeodopsis bilkjeviczi (Birula, 1907) — Turkmenistan
 Galeodopsis birulae (Hirst, 1912) — Iran
 Galeodopsis cyrus (Pocock, 1895) — Iran, Iraq, Pakistan, Saudi Arabia
 Galeodopsis strandi Birula, 1936 — Turkmenistan
 Galeodopsis tripolitanus (Hirst, 1912) — Libya

References 

Arachnid genera
Solifugae